Laffy Taffy is an American  brand of taffy candies produced by the Ferrara Candy Company, a subsidiary of Ferrero. The candies are small (about ), individually wrapped taffy rectangles available in a variety of colors and artificial fruit flavors, including banana, strawberry, green apple, grape, blueberry, watermelon, blue raspberry, and cherry. Rarer flavors include caramel apple, coconut, strawberries & cream, apple crisp, chocolate mousse, pumpkin donut, pineapple, guava, orange sorbet, and lemon raspberry. Discontinued flavors include fruit punch, mango, strawberry banana, peppermint, and hot cocoa.

The name "Laffy Taffy" refers to both the texture of the taffy as well as its embodiment of silliness: short, question-and-answer-style jokes are printed on the outside of each wrapper, such as "What do you call a cow with no legs? – Ground beef." Some jokes are pun-based, such as "What is Labor Day? – That's when mommies have their babies." Others are based on silly word play, such as "What's an owl's favorite subject? – Owlgebra." These jokes are usually sent in by children who are credited on the wrapper.

History 
The brand was first produced in the 1970s by Kathryn Beich Candies of Bloomington, Illinois as "Beich's [Name of Flavor] Caramels", though these were not in fact caramels but fruit-flavored taffy squares. The Beichs later changed the name of the product to "Beich's Laffy Taffy", which occurred some years prior to the acquisition of the distribution rights and the eventual purchase of the product line by Nestlé in 1984. Laffy Taffy was originally advertised as having a "long-lasting" flavor. Though it used to come in thick, square-shaped pieces, it is now sold in thinner, rectangular pieces. In 2003, the Willy Wonka brand introduced a variety called "Flavor Flippers", with each piece of taffy having an outer layer of one flavor and a soft center of a different flavor.

In January 2018, Nestlé announced plans to sell its U.S. confectionery brands, including Laffy Taffy, to Italian chocolatier Ferrero SpA, maker of Nutella, for $2.8 billion. Ferrero folded the acquired brands into the operations of the Ferrara Candy Company and will increase investment in marketing into 2020.

Ingredients
Ingredients vary by flavor. The following ingredients are shown on wrappers and were formerly shown on the Willy Wonka website:

 Corn syrup and/or sugar
 Hydrogenated coconut oil or palm oil

The following are less than 2%:
 Malic acid
 Monoglycerides and diglycerides
 Hydrogenated cottonseed oil
 Salt
 Soy lecithin
 Artificial flavor
 Trans fat

Amounts of the following depend on the flavor, color, and size of each individual piece:
 Sugar
 Egg

References

External links 
 Wonka official site
LaffyTaffy Website

The Willy Wonka Candy Company brands
Brand name confectionery
Candy
Sugar